Cerium stearate is a metal-organic compound, a salt of cerium and stearic acid with the chemical formula . The compound is classified as a metallic soap, i.e. a metal derivative of a fatty acid.

Synthesis
A reaction of cerium oxide with stearic acid in an inert atmosphere at temperatures between 100 and 200 °C.

Also, it can be obtained by the reaction of cerium nitrate and potassium stearate.

Physical properties
The compound forms white powder.

Insoluble in water.

Uses
The compound is used in a variety of industrial and laboratory applications: as a lubricant, antioxidant, and antifoaming agent. Also used as a catalyst in the synthesis of polymers and as a stabilizer in the production of plastics.

References

Stearates
Cerium compounds